Theodorus of Cyrene was an ancient Greek mathematician who lived during the 5th century BC. The only first-hand accounts of him that survive are in three of Plato's dialogues: the Theaetetus, the Sophist, and the Statesman. In the former dialogue, he posits a mathematical theorem now known as the Spiral of Theodorus.

Life
Little is known as Theodorus' biography beyond what can be inferred from Plato's dialogues. He was born in the northern African colony of Cyrene, and apparently taught both there and in Athens. He complains of old age in the Theaetetus, the dramatic date of 399 BC of which suggests his period of flourishing to have occurred in the mid-5th century. The text also associates him with the sophist Protagoras, with whom he claims to have studied before turning to geometry. A dubious tradition repeated among ancient biographers like Diogenes Laërtius held that Plato later studied with him in Cyrene, Libya.
This eminent mathematician Theodorus was, along with Alcibiades and many other of Socrates companions (many of which would be associated with the Thirty Tyrants), accused of distributing the mysteries at a symposium, according to Plutarch, who himself was priest of the temple at Delphi.

Work in mathematics
Theodorus' work is known through a sole theorem, which is delivered in the literary context of the Theaetetus and has been argued alternately to be historically accurate or fictional. In the text, his student Theaetetus attributes to him the theorem that the square roots of the non-square numbers up to 17 are irrational:

The square containing two square units is not mentioned, perhaps because the incommensurability of its side with the unit was already known.) Theodorus's method of proof is not known. It is not even known whether, in the quoted passage, "up to" (μέχρι) means that seventeen is included. If seventeen is excluded, then Theodorus's proof may have relied merely on considering whether numbers are even or odd.  Indeed, Hardy and Wright

A possibility suggested earlier by Zeuthen is that Theodorus applied the so-called Euclidean algorithm, formulated in Proposition X.2 of the Elements as a test for incommensurability. In modern terms, the theorem is that a real number with an infinite continued fraction expansion is irrational. Irrational square roots have periodic expansions. The period of the square root of 19 has length 6, which is greater than the period of the square root of any smaller number. The period of √17 has length one (so does √18; but the irrationality of √18 follows from that of √2).

The so-called Spiral of Theodorus is composed of contiguous right triangles with hypotenuse lengths equal √2, √3, √4, …, √17; additional triangles cause the diagram to overlap. Philip J. Davis interpolated the vertices of the spiral to get a continuous curve. He discusses the history of attempts to determine Theodorus' method in his book Spirals: From Theodorus to Chaos, and makes brief references to the matter in his fictional Thomas Gray series.

That Theaetetus established a more general theory of irrationals, whereby square roots of non-square numbers are irrational, is suggested in the eponymous Platonic dialogue as well as commentary on, and scholia to, the Elements.

See also
Chronology of ancient Greek mathematicians
List of speakers in Plato's dialogues
Quadratic irrational
Wilbur Knorr

References

Further reading

Ancient Greek mathematicians
5th-century BC Greek people
Cyrenean Greeks
5th-century BC mathematicians